The Jüdische Zeitung (English Jewish newspaper) was a monthly newspaper in German language, founded in autumn 2005 by Werner Media Group Berlin. It ceased publication in 2014. The target audience of the monthly publication was the German-speaking Jewish community as well as all readers interested in topics of Judaism. The journal informed about relevant events from Europe, the US and especially from Israel. Upon its formation it joined the previously founded monthly newspaper Еврейская газета (English Jewish newspaper) published in the Russian language in Germany also by the same publishing house, published since 2002.

Topics
current political, religious (not only Jewish), social, cultural and economic events in Germany
world affairs and Diaspora
tradition and modernity
Jewish community and contemporary Judaism
interreligious dialogue
views and disputes about current questions of Judaism and many general social, relevant themes
updated Jewish art and culture
science and education in Jewish context
history of Judaism

See also
Jewish newspaper

External links
 homepage
 Jüdische Zeitungen aus Berlin
 Medienschau Nahost
 Deutsche Welle
 Pressekatalog
 Holocaustliteratur
 homepage of Еврейская газета

Notes
Jüdische Allgemeine

Jewish newspapers
Newspapers published in Berlin
Publications established in 2005
Publications disestablished in 2014

de:Jüdische Zeitung (Berlin)